The 1788–89 United States presidential election in Virginia took place between December 15, 1788, and January 10, 1789, as part of the 1788–1789 United States presidential election to elect the first President. Voters chose 12 representatives, or electors to the Electoral College, who voted for President and Vice President. However, one elector did not vote and another elector was not chosen because an election district failed to submit returns, resulting in only 10 electoral votes being submitted.

Virginia unanimously voted for nonpartisan candidate and commander-in-chief of the Continental Army George Washington. The total popular vote is composed of 3,040 for Federalist electors and 1,293 for Anti-Federalist electors, all of whom were supportive of Washington.

Results

References

Virginia
1789
1789 Virginia elections